St Leonards is a village in south east Dorset, England, situated on the A31 road approximately  south-west of Ringwood, Hampshire,  north of Bournemouth and  north-east of Ferndown. With adjacent St Ives and Ashley Heath, it forms the civil parish of St Leonards and St Ives, which had a population of 6,859 in 2011.

For the youth there is a youth club for ages 10–18 on a Monday and Wednesday, situated in Braeside Park near the village hall and by the scout hut.

External links
St Leonards and St Ives Parish Community Website
St Leonards & St Ives Parish Council
Census data

Saint Leonards, Dorset